Francis Anthony Bradley (born June 13, 1942) is an American politician in the state of Minnesota. He served in the Minnesota House of Representatives.

References

1942 births
Living people
People from Lincoln County, Minnesota
Republican Party members of the Minnesota House of Representatives